Ignacio Torres Olvera (born 25 September 1983) is a Mexican retired footballer, who played as a midfielder.

Career
He was a member of the Mexico National Team in the FIFA U-20 World Cup hosted by the United Arab Emirates in 2003. Previously he played in the Jaibos Tampico Madero (2005–2006) on loan from América. He returned to San Luis F.C. when his loan contract ended with América.

References

External links

1983 births
Living people
Mexico under-20 international footballers
Mexican people of Panamanian descent
Liga MX players
Ascenso MX players
Club América footballers
San Luis F.C. players
Atlante F.C. footballers
C.F. Mérida footballers
Club Celaya footballers
Tampico Madero F.C. footballers
Atlético San Luis footballers
Footballers from Mexico City
Association football midfielders
Mexican footballers